The Rogue River Press is a weekly newspaper serving the southern part of the U.S. state of Oregon, established in 1915. It is published in Jackson County and circulates about 2,000 newspapers to Rogue River, Gold Hill, Wimer, and the Evans Valley. It is a venue for reaching the public, though its selection over the larger Mail Tribune for publishing foreclosure notices in 2012 was part of an effort that met with criticism.

The Press was founded in 1915. It has been owned by Valley Pride Publications since 1994, and its publisher is Teresa Pearson.

References

External links 
 Official website

Newspapers published in Oregon
Jackson County, Oregon